Kodak Professional T-MAX Film is a continuous tone, panchromatic, tabular-grain black and white negative film originally developed and manufactured by Eastman Kodak since 1986. It is still manufactured by Eastman Kodak but distributed and marketed by Kodak Alaris, as with other products under Kodak Professional banner.

It is sold in three speeds: ISO 100, ISO 400 and 3200 which is a multi-speed film. To easily identify the emulsion, for each film speed, one letter in the edge marking is altered with ISO 100 being TMX, ISO 400 being TMY and ISO 3200 being TMZ.

Details
Eastman Kodak still manufactures the films but following its Chapter 11 bankruptcy in 2012, responsibility for distribution and marketing, as with other products under Kodak Professional brand, was given to Kodak Alaris, a separate company controlled by the Kodak UK pension fund.

It is sold in three speeds: 100 (TMX), 400 (TMY-2) and 3200 (TMZ). The 100 and 400 speeds are given as ISO numbers, but the 3200 is sold as a multi-speed film. T-MAX 100, due to its very high resolution of 200 lines/mm, is often used when testing the sharpness of lenses.

In early 2002, Kodak replaced its similarly titled Kodak T-MAX Professional Film with Kodak Professional T-MAX Film. There was also a slight change to the packaging. The main difference between the two are in the processing times.

In October 2007, Kodak revised the 400-speed film, giving it the name TMY-2 instead of TMY. In the process Kodak increased the resolution from 125 lines/mm to 200 lines/mm, which is on par with their 100 speed film.

The 3200 speed is actually nominally 800 to 1000 speed, but it is meant to be push-processed and the DX CAS code on the 135 film cartridges is set to 3200 speed. It has uses in surveillance and other work where it can be given a pushed exposure index between 1600 and 25000. It is also used in X-ray cameras in high-neutron environments where CCDs are unviable due to noise induced by neutron impacts, such as the National Ignition Facility.

On October 1, 2012, Kodak announced the discontinuation of Kodak Professional T-MAX P3200 film due to the high expense of manufacturing it for only a limited user demand. On February 23, 2018, Kodak announced the return of the film for March 2018.

See also
 Kodak Tri-X
 List of photographic films
 List of discontinued photographic films

References

Further reading
 
 

TMax